Etting is a surname. Notable people with the surname include: 

Brian R. Etting, American producer, director, and screenwriter
Emlen Etting (1905–1993), American painter, sculptor, and filmmaker
Gloria Braggiotti Etting (1909–2003), American dancer, newspaper columnist, photographer, and author
Ruth Etting (1896–1978), American singer and actress
Shinah Solomon Etting (1744–1822), American matriarch
Solomon Etting (1764–1847), American merchant and politician